Arara is a municipality in the state of Paraíba in northeastern Brazil. It is located in the mesoregion of Agreste Paraibano and the microregion of Western Curimataú, 155 km from the state capital, João Pessoa. It is located on the high plain of Borborema at an altitude of 467 m above sea level.

History

Originally, the area was occupied by the Cariri people. The countryside was covered in Schinopsis brasiliensis trees, whose wood was black, known in the local indigenous language as Baraúna. The trees served as shelter for people traveling to the nearby areas of Brejo and Curimataú to buy flour, cassava and rapadura, basic foods available in those areas. The area was known as "Baraúnas das Araras" because of the large number of macaws (Portuguese arara) that could be found there as late as 1860, when the priest José Antônio Maria Ibiapina arrived in the area from Ceará. He had greatly influenced the civilizing of the Curimataú area. He founded the Santa Fé sanitarium near the site of today's city, on land donated by Major Antônio José da Cunha, owner of lime deposits in the area.

Major Antônio José da Cunha also built the first house in the future village of Arara, and contributed much to its development up to 1881, when he died at the age of 94.

Padre Ibiapina also founded the Mother Church of Arara, under the name of Nossa Senhora da Piedade (Our Lady of Piety), and provided services to the forming community. By 1876, the village had about 80 houses and 500 inhabitants.

In 1937 and 1938, in the administrative division of Brazil, Arara was mentioned as part of the municipality of Serraria. On 1 December 1961, the town was separated from Serraria and incorporated as a separate municipality. Many people worked toward this goal, including Dr. Marinésio Moreno, Dr. Mário Moreno, and Marísio da Cunha Moreno.

Climate

Located on a high plain, the city has a Semi-arid climate, with average annual temperatures in the range of 22 °C. The rainy season begins in January or February, and continues to September or October.

Demographics

According to the IBGE (Brazilian Institute of Geography and Statistics) of 2020, there were 13,542 people residing in the municipality. The population density was 127.66 inhabitants/km2.

The last census the IBGE of 2000, revealed the following numbers: 7,109 Pardo (Brown) people (61.66%), 4,033 White people (34.98%), 350 Black people (3,03%).

List of mayors

References

External links
 Brazilian government data sheet

Municipalities in Paraíba